Ampelus (Latin) or Ampelos (lit."Vine") was a town in the southeast extremity of ancient Crete, on a cape of the same name.

Its site is tentatively located near Farmakokefalo.

References

Populated places in ancient Crete
Former populated places in Greece